4th Bombay Native Infantry may refer to:

107th Pioneers which was the 1st Battalion, 4th Bombay Native Infantry in 1796
108th Infantry which was the 2nd Battalion, 4th Bombay Native Infantry in 1796
104th Wellesley's Rifles which was the 4th Bombay Native Infantry in 1824